Carleton is a village on the coastal plain of the Fylde in the Borough of Wyre in Lancashire, England. It consists of Great Carleton, Little Carleton, Norcross and Whiteholme and is situated close to Poulton-le-Fylde. Other nearby settlements include Thornton, Bispham and Blackpool. Historically, Carleton was in the parish of Poulton-le-Fylde. It borders the Borough of Blackpool immediately to the west.

Shops and amenities
Shops and restaurants in Carleton include The Castle Gardens pub, Suda Thai restaurant and takeaway, Gleaves newsagents, a fish and chip shop, convenience store, barbers, several hairdressers, a dry cleaners, a chemist and A GP surgery.

History
Carleton was listed in the Domesday Book of 1086 as Carlentun. The name usually means "farmstead or estate of the freemen or peasants", derived from the Old Scandinavian word karl and the Old English word tūn. Its area was estimated in that survey to be four carucates of land and it was owned by Earl Tostig. In the 12th century, Carleton was owned by Gilbert Fitz Reinfred, and in the 13th century, by Emma de St. John.

A free school, Carleton St Hilda's C of E Primary School, was founded in 1604 and is still open today.

Carleton Crematorium and Cemetery opened in 1935.

Governance
Carleton is an electoral ward in the parliamentary constituency of Wyre and Preston North. The population of this ward at the 2011 census was 4,061.  Since its creation in 2010, Wyre and Preston North has been represented at Parliament by Conservative MP Ben Wallace.

Religion
The Anglican church of St Hilda of Whitby and the Roman Catholic church of St Martin de Porres share a site on Fleetwood Road. St Hilda's is part of the ecclesiastical parish of St Chad's Church, Poulton-le-Fylde in the Diocese of Blackburn. St Martin's is in the Roman Catholic Diocese of Lancaster.

References

Footnotes

Sources

External links

Geography of the Borough of Wyre
Villages in Lancashire
Poulton-le-Fylde